Bob Bird (17 June 1875 – 21 July 1946) was a former Australian rules footballer who played with Collingwood and Carlton in the Victorian Football League (VFL).

Notes

External links 

		
Bob Bird's profile at Blueseum
Bird's profile at Collingwood Forever

1875 births
1946 deaths
Australian rules footballers from Melbourne
Collingwood Football Club players
Carlton Football Club players